Venture Philanthropy Partners (VPP) is a philanthropic organization based in the DC metro area that  was founded in 2000 by Mario Morino, Raul Fernandez, and Mark Warner to invest in high-performing nonprofits in Greater Washington, D.C. Since then, it has made over $50 million in direct investments in nonprofits serving children and youth.

VPP provides technical support along with its grants. It makes investments in three areas: Early Childhood, Education, and Youth Transitions. Since its inception, VPP has invested in organizations that have offered service to some 40,000 children and youth around the National Capital Region.

VPP states its mission as aiming "... to help strong leaders make their organizations as effective as they can be".

Methodology 

VPP does not ask for grant applications; rather, it looks for NPs with growth capacity. VPP does not fund programs; it focuses on general operation support.

With its first fund, VPP focused on smaller grants for 12 organizations over a period of 9 years. With its second fund, it went to on larger and longer investments in fewer organizations.

List of Portfolio I Investments

AALEAD
Boys and Girls Clubs of Greater Washington
Center for Multicultural and Humans Services
CentroNía (Formerly Calvary Multicultural Learning Center)
Child and Family Network Services
College Summit, National Capital Region
Friendship Public Charter School
Heads Up
Latin American Youth Center
Mary's Center for Maternal and Child Care
See Forever Foundation (Which operates the Maya Angelou Public Charter Schools
SEED Foundation (Which operates the SEED School)

List of Portfolio II Investments

KIPP DC (Local DC chapter of the KIPP Foundation)
 Urban Alliance
Year Up, National Capital Region

List of organizations in 

College Summit, National Capital Region
KIPP DC (Local DC chapter of the KIPP Foundation)
Latin American Youth Center
Metro TeenAIDS
Urban Alliance
Year Up, National Capital Region

References

Organizations based in Washington, D.C.